Chiuppano is a town in the province of Vicenza, Veneto, Italy. It is east of SP349.

Sources
(Google Maps)

References

Cities and towns in Veneto